Jūratė Narvidaite is a retired Lithuanian rowing coxswain who won a silver and a gold medal in the eights event at the European championships of 1966–1967.

References

Year of birth missing (living people)
Living people
Lithuanian female rowers
Coxswains (rowing)
Soviet female rowers
European Rowing Championships medalists